The 2014–15 Liga MX season  (known as the Liga BBVA Bancomer MX for sponsorship reasons) was the 68th professional top-flight football league season in Mexico. The season was split into two competitions:  the Torneo Apertura and the Torneo Clausura; each of identical format and contested by the same eighteen teams.

Teams, stadiums, and personnel
Eighteen teams competed that season. Atlante was relegated to the Ascenso MX after accumulating the lowest coefficient over the past three seasons. Atlante was relegated and replaced by the Apertura 2013 Ascenso MX champion Leones Negros, after defeating in a promotional play-off the Clausura 2014 title defenders Estudiantes Tecos.

Stadiums and locations

Stadium changes

Personnel and kits

Managerial changes

Torneo Apertura
The Apertura 2014 was the opening competition of the season. The regular season began on July 18, 2014, and ended on November 23, 2014. León were the defending champions, having won the 2013 Apertura and 2014 Clausura tournaments.

Regular season

Standings

Liguilla - Apertura

 Teams are re-seeded each round.
 Team with more goals on aggregate after two matches advances.
 "Away goals rule" was applied in the play-off round, but not the final.
 In the quarterfinals and semifinals, if the two teams were tied on aggregate and away goals, the higher seeded team advanced.
 In the final, if the two teams were tied after both legs, the match went to extra-time and, if necessary, a shootout.
 Both finalists qualified to the 2015–16 CONCACAF Champions League (in Pot 3).

Top goalscorers
Players are listed by goals, then last name

Source: Medio Tiempo

Top assists

Source: ESPN FC

Hat-tricks

* Scored 4 goals

Torneo Clausura
The Clausura 2015 was the second competition of the season. The regular phase of the tournament began on January 9, and ended on May 10. América successfully defended their title when they won the Apertura tournament for a record 12th title, but they were eliminated in the Liguilla quarterfinals.

Regular season

Standings

Liguilla - Clausura

 Teams were re-seeded each round.
 Team with more goals on aggregate after two matches advances.
 Away goals rule was applied in the quarterfinals and semifinals, but not in the final.
 In the quarterfinals and semifinals, if the two teams were tied on aggregate and away goals, the higher seeded team advances.
 In the final, if the two teams were tied after both legs, the match went to extra-time and, if necessary, a shootout.
 Both finalists qualified to the 2015–16 CONCACAF Champions League (in Pot 3).

Top goalscorers
Players ranked by goals scored, then alphabetically by last name.

Top assists

Source: ESPN FC

Hat-tricks

* Scored 4 goals

Aggregate table

Relegation

Last update: May 10, 2015

References

External links
 Official website of Liga MX
 Mediotiempo.com

Mx
1
2014-15